Chris Raymond Gatling (born September 3, 1967) is an American former professional basketball player. Gatling played for many National Basketball Association (NBA) teams from 1991 to 2002. He played for the US national team in the 1990 FIBA World Championship, winning the bronze medal.

College career
Gatling played three years at Old Dominion University after transferring there from the University of Pittsburgh. He is ODU's sixth all-time scorer with 1,811 points. He also hauled down 859 career rebounds which rank him ninth all-time. Gatling is the school's all-time field goal percentage leader at .606 (697–1150), and is second all-time at ODU with (12) 30-point games.  He shot .620 (251–405) from the field in 1991.

Gatling scored 36 points in a game against UNC Charlotte in 1991 and against Alabama-Birmingham in March 1989. He earned honorable mention All-American honors in 1990 and 1991. Gatling was named sophomore of the year in 1988, and then Sun Belt Conference Player of the Year in both 1990 and 1991. In 1991, he was named the Sun Belt Conference tournament Most Valuable Player as he led the then seventh seeded Monarchs to the finals before losing to South Alabama.

Professional career
Gatling was drafted 16th overall by the Golden State Warriors in the 1991 NBA draft. He spent the first four years of his career with the Warriors, and averaged 13.7 points and 7.6 rebounds per game in his final full season with the Warriors, 1994–95.  That same year, Gatling led the NBA in field goal percentage at 0.633-one of the ten highest percentages in NBA history.

Gatling was traded, along with Tim Hardaway, to the Miami Heat halfway through the 1995–96 season, and also played for the Dallas Mavericks and New Jersey Nets during the 1996–97 season (representing the Mavericks in the 1997 NBA All-Star Game only a few days before being traded to the Nets).

He played 78 games in slightly more than two seasons with the Nets before requesting a trade. He played next with the Milwaukee Bucks for the final thirty games of the lockout-shortened 1998–99 season. He split the 1999–2000 season with the Denver Nuggets and the Orlando Magic. His final two NBA seasons saw him with the Cleveland Cavaliers and again, the Heat. Gatling retired from the NBA following the 2001–02 season with career averages of 10.3 points and 5.3 rebounds per game, and a .513 field goal percentage.

After his NBA career ended in 2002, he played one season in Russian League with CSKA Moscow.

Personal life
Gatling attended Elizabeth High School in Elizabeth, New Jersey. Gatling is known for his frequent use of the headband as an accessory to his NBA uniform. In 2001, he stated that he started the practice as a reminder that he is lucky to be alive after suffering a serious head injury as a teenager.

In December 2017, Gatling was sentenced in Maricopa County, Arizona to two and a half years in prison for fraud.

NBA career statistics

Regular season

|-
| align="left" | 1991–92
| align="left" | Golden State
| 54 || 1 || 11.3 || .568 || .000 || .661 || 3.4 || .3 || .6 || .7 || 5.7
|-
| align="left" | 1992–93
| align="left" | Golden State
| 70 || 11 || 17.8 || .539 || .000 || .725 || 4.6 || .6 || .6 || .8 || 9.3
|-
| align="left" | 1993–94
| align="left" | Golden State
| 82 || 23 || 15.8 || .588 || .000 || .620 || 4.8 || .5 || .5 || .8 || 8.2
|-
| align="left" | 1994–95
| align="left" | Golden State
| 58 || 22 || 25.3 ||style="background:#cfecec;"| .633* || .000 || .592 || 7.6 || .9 || .7 || .9 || 13.7
|-
| align="left" | 1995–96
| align="left" | Golden State
| 47 || 2 || 18.3 || .555 || .000 || .636 || 5.1 || .6 || .4 || .6 || 9.1
|-
| align="left" | 1995–96
| align="left" | Miami
| 24 || 0 || 23.5 || .598 || .000 || .733 || 7.3 || .7 || .7 || .5 || 15.2
|-
| align="left" | 1996–97
| align="left" | Dallas
| 44 || 1 || 27.1 || .533 || .167 || .706 || 7.9 || .6 || .8 || .7 || 19.1
|-
| align="left" | 1996–97
| align="left" | New Jersey
| 3 || 0 || 30.7 || .419 || .000 || .938 || 7.3 || 1.0 || 1.3 || .0 || 17.0
|-
| align="left" | 1997–98
| align="left" | New Jersey
| 57 || 16 || 23.8 || .455 || .250 || .600 || 5.9 || .9 || .9 || .5 || 11.5
|-
| align="left" | 1998–99
| align="left" | New Jersey
| 18 || 2 || 15.6 || .371 || .000 || .500 || 3.6 || .7 || .4 || .2 || 4.7
|-
| align="left" | 1998–99
| align="left" | Milwaukee
| 30 || 1 || 16.5 || .482 || .143 || .362 || 3.8 || .7 || .8 || .2 || 6.3
|-
| align="left" | 1999–00
| align="left" | Orlando
| 45 || 0 || 23.1 || .455 || .304 || .698 || 6.6 || .9 || 1.1 || .2 || 13.3
|-
| align="left" | 1999–00
| align="left" | Denver
| 40 || 0 || 19.3 || .456 || .234 || .742 || 5.1 || .8 || .8 || .3 || 10.4
|-
| align="left" | 2000–01
| align="left" | Cleveland
| 74 || 6 || 22.6 || .449 || .304 || .684 || 5.3 || .8 || .7 || .4 || 11.4
|-
| align="left" | 2001–02
| align="left" | Miami
| 54 || 1 || 15.0 || .447 || .125 || .701 || 3.8 || .5 || .3 || .2 || 6.4
|- class="sortbottom"
| style="text-align:center;" colspan="2"| Career
| 700 || 86 || 19.7 || .513 || .249 || .660 || 5.3 || .7 || .7 || .5 || 10.3
|- class="sortbottom"
| style="text-align:center;" colspan="2"| All-Star
| 1 || 0 || 12.0 || .125 || .000 || .000 || 2.0 || .0 || 1.0 || .0 || 2.0

Playoffs

|-
| align="left" | 1992
| align="left" | Golden State
| 4 || 0 || 20.3 || .621 || .000 || .636 || 6.3 || .0 || .5 || 2.5 || 12.5
|-
| align="left" | 1994
| align="left" | Golden State
| 3 || 1 || 18.0 || .615 || .000 || .769 || 5.7 || 1.3 || .7 || .3 || 8.7
|-
| align="left" | 1996
| align="left" | Miami
| 3 || 0 || 22.7 || .273 || .000 || .500 || 8.0 || 0.3 || .7 || .0 || 6.0
|-
| align="left" | 1998
| align="left" | New Jersey
| 3 || 1 || 27.0 || .500 || .000 || .667 || 3.3 || .7 || .7 || .7 || 15.3
|-
| align="left" | 1999
| align="left" | Milwaukee
| 2 || 0 || 6.0 || .000 || .000 || .000 || 1.5 || .0 || .5 || .0 || .0
|- class="sortbottom"
| style="text-align:center;" colspan="2"| Career
| 15 || 2 || 19.7 || .490 || .000 || .623 || 5.3 || .5 || .6 || .9 || 9.3

References

External links
 
 ESPN profile
 MavsWiki

1967 births
Living people
1990 FIBA World Championship players
American expatriate basketball people in Italy
American expatriate basketball people in Russia
American men's basketball players
Basketball players from New Jersey
Cleveland Cavaliers players
Competitors at the 1990 Goodwill Games
Dallas Mavericks players
Denver Nuggets players
Elizabeth High School (New Jersey) alumni
Golden State Warriors draft picks
Golden State Warriors players
Goodwill Games medalists in basketball
Miami Heat players
Milwaukee Bucks players
National Basketball Association All-Stars
New Jersey Nets players
Old Dominion Monarchs men's basketball players
Orlando Magic players
PBC CSKA Moscow players
Power forwards (basketball)
Sportspeople from Elizabeth, New Jersey
United States men's national basketball team players
Victoria Libertas Pallacanestro players